James L. Wade (February 14, 1925 – November 20, 2019) was an American football halfback who played for the Pittsburgh Steelers. He played college football at Oklahoma City University, having previously attended Talihina High School. Wade was a veteran of World War II. He died in November 2019 at the age of 94.

References

1925 births
2019 deaths
American football halfbacks
New York Bulldogs players
Oklahoma City Chiefs football players
People from Le Flore County, Oklahoma
Players of American football from Oklahoma
Military personnel from Oklahoma